The 2015–16 Buffalo Bulls women's basketball team represents the University at Buffalo during the 2015–16 NCAA Division I women's basketball season. The Bulls, led by fourth year head coach Felisha Legette-Jack, play their home games at Alumni Arena as members of the East Division of the Mid-American Conference. They finished the season 20–14, 8–10 in MAC play to finish in third place in the East Division. They won the MAC women's tournament and earn an automatic trip to the NCAA women's tournament for the first time in school history where they lost in the first round to Ohio State.

NCAA invitation 
Buffalo finished the regular-season tied for seventh in the conference and were assigned the eight seed for the 2016 MAC women's basketball tournament. In the first round game, they beat Bowling Green 64–44, then knocked off the top-seeded Ohio 72–60. After upsetting the fifth seed Akron 88–87 in the semifinals, they face the second-seeded Central Michigan for the tournament championship. This game would be even closer, as it would go to overtime. The game was still tied with 3.4 seconds left in the game. The ball was inbounded to Stephanie Reid who dribbled around a  screen and put up a shot that went off the glass, and through the net to win the game 73–71. The win gave Buffalo the first ever championship of the Mid-America Conference and their first ever invitation to the NCAA tournament.

Roster

Schedule
Source: 

|-
!colspan=9 style="background:#041A9B; color:white;"|  Exhibition

|-
!colspan=9 style="background:#041A9B; color:white;"| Non-conference regular season

|-
!colspan=9 style="background:#041A9B; color:white;"| MAC regular season

|-
!colspan=9 style="background:#041A9B; color:white;"| MAC Women's Tournament

|-
!colspan=9 style="background:#041A9B; color:white;"| NCAA Women's Tournament

See also
2015–16 Buffalo Bulls men's basketball team

References

2015–16 UB Women's Basketball

Buffalo
Buffalo Bulls women's basketball seasons
Buffalo
Buffalo Bulls
Buffalo Bulls